Gun is a language in the Gbe languages group. It is spoken by the Ogu people in Benin, as well as in south-western Nigeria. Gun is part of the Fon cluster of languages inside the Eastern Gbe languages; it is close to Fon, especially its Agbome and Kpase varieties, as well as to the Maxi and Weme (Ouémé) languages. It is used in some schools in the Ouémé Department of Benin.

Gun is the second most spoken language in Benin. It is mainly spoken in the south of the country, in Porto-Novo, Sèmè-Kpodji, Bonou, Adjarra, Avrankou, Dangbo, Akpro-Missérété, Cotonou, and other cities where Ogu people live. It is also spoken by a minority of Ogu people in southwest Nigeria near the border with Benin, particularly Badagry, Maun, Tube.

Orthography 
The language has been written with three orthographies, all of them based on the Latin alphabet. In Nigeria, it has been written with an orthography similar to that of Yoruba and some other languages of Nigeria, and using the dot below diacritic to indicate sounds. There are proposals to unify the orthographies, for example the one made by Hounkpati Capo in 1990.

References

Bibliography 
 
 

Gbe languages
Languages of Benin
Languages of Nigeria